Dhirendra Pal Singh, known as D. P. Singh, is an Indian naturalist and academic administrator. On 22 August 2022, Uttar Pradesh Government named him as the Education Adviser to Chief Minister.

He has served as vice-chancellor of three different universities, namely Dr. Hari Singh Gour University, Banaras Hindu University and Devi Ahilya Vishwavidyalaya. He is the former director of National Assessment and Accreditation Council (NAAC). He has also served as the chairman of the University Grants Commission (UGC).

Career
Singh served as vice-chancellor (VC) of three different universities. From 2004 to 2008 he served as VC of Dr. Hari Singh Gour University, a Central University located in Sagar, Madhya Pradesh. From 2008 to 2011 he served as VC of  Banaras Hindu University in Varanasi, Uttar Pradesh and finally from 2012 to 2015 he served as VC of Devi Ahilya Vishwavidyalaya in Indore, Madhya Pradesh. In August 2015 he was appointed director of the National Assessment and Accreditation Council (NAAC) for a term of five years. However, in December 2017 he was elevated to the position of chairman of the University Grants Commission for a period of five years.

References

Indian naturalists
Living people
Scientists from Indore
Academic staff of Banaras Hindu University
Year of birth missing (living people)